A polo pony is the term used for a horse used in the game of polo. They may be of any breed or combination of breeds, though many have a significant amount of Thoroughbred breeding. They are called "ponies", but that is a reference to their agile type rather than their size; almost all are horse-sized.  They require considerable training and ongoing conditioning, and because each rider requires at least two horses in a single match, this can be a considerable expense.  When playing, polo ponies have their manes roached and tails braided so that there is no danger of being tangled in the mallet.

Size
Although they are called "ponies", this is a reference to their agile type rather than their size.

Breeds

Various breeds used include mountain ponies from the Himalayas, Manipur ponies from Manipur, Arabians and the ever-popular Thoroughbred and its crosses. In the United States, Thoroughbreds and Quarter Horses are often crossed to produce polo ponies, while in recent years crosses of Thoroughbreds and Criollo horses from Argentina have become popular. In Australia, Australian Stock Horses are the most common breed used in polo.

Preparation
Polo ponies need to be trained so that they are not afraid to bump into other horses, and not to shy at the ball or at mallets swinging near their heads. They need to be quick and agile so they can turn and follow the ball through its many movements.  They also need to be in good physical condition; there are usually four to six chukkas per match, each chukka lasting seven and a half minutes, with the horse being on the move throughout.  It is typical for a single player to have numerous horses available for each match, using a separate horse for each chukka, sometimes two.   Thus there are significant costs of ownership and time required for exercise and conditioning of a polo string. Their diet may include grains, the best and most natural source of food ponies is good pasture and dry hay.

Grooming

Polo ponies have their manes hogged and their tails plaited up before a match, so that the polo mallet will not get tangled in them.  Formerly, their tails would be docked and banged.  Today, polo ponies in competition often have their dock trimmed or shaved, and the skirt of the tail is braided and folded up against the tailbone.  The braid is tied off with a lock of hair excluded from the braid, taped, or tied off and taped.

See also
Horseball
Polocrosse

References

Types of horse
Polo